The Millionaire is a 1927 film directed by Oscar Micheaux.

Cast
Grace Smith
J. Lawrence Criner
Cleo Desmond
Lionel Monagas
William Edmonson
Vera Brocker
S. T. Jacks
E. G. Tatum
Chicago Defender editor Robert S. Abbott also appears in the film

References

External links

1927 films